Hank Phillippi Ryan (born Harriet Ann Sablosky) is an American investigative reporter for Channel 7 News on WHDH-TV, a local television station in Boston, Massachusetts.  She is also an author of mystery novels.

Biography 

Ryan is a native of Indianapolis, Indiana.  She attended Western College for Women in Oxford, Ohio and studied at the International School in Hamburg, Germany.  Her first job in broadcasting was in 1971 as  reporter for WIBC radio, then after a stint as a legislative assistant in Washington, DC for the Administrative Practice and Procedure Subcommittee of the Senate Judiciary Committee, she became an editorial assistant at Rolling Stone's Washington Bureau.

She joined WTHR-TV in Indianapolis as political reporter in 1975, then WSB-TV in Atlanta in 1976 as political reporter and weekend anchor. Ryan joined WNEV-TV (present-day WHDH) in 1983 as a general assignment reporter and in 1989, she was named principal reporter for the station's investigative unit. Ryan has won multiple Emmy Awards and Edward R. Murrow Awards for her investigative and consumer reporting.

Ryan has won multiple awards for her crime fiction, including Agathas, Anthonys, the Daphne, Macavitys, and for The Other Woman, the Mary Higgins Clark Award. National reviews have called her a "master at crafting suspenseful mysteries" and "a superb and gifted storyteller."

An investigative reporter at Boston's WHDH-TV and a television reporter since 1975, her work has resulted in new laws, people sent to prison, homes removed from foreclosure, and millions of dollars in refunds and restitution for victims and consumers. 

Ryan was the 2019 Guest of Honor at Bouchercon, the world mystery convention.

Personal life
Ryan lives with her husband, civil rights and criminal defense lawyer Jonathan Shapiro, in suburban Boston. Although referred to by family as "Ann" or "Annie" while growing up, she was given her trademark nickname "Hank" by a college friend who told her "You don’t look like a Harriet. I’ll call you 'Hank'."Award-winning television reporter turned mystery novelist Hank Phillippi Ryan shares her story

Bibliography

Charlotte McNally series 
Prime Time (2007), Harlequin. 
Face Time  (2007), Harlequin. 
Air Time (2009), Mira. 
Drive Time (2009), Mira.

Jane Ryland/Jake Brogan thrillers 
The Other Woman (2012), Forge Books. 
The Wrong Girl (2013), Forge Books. 
Truth Be Told (2014), Forge Books. 
What you See (2015), Forge Books. 
Say No More (2016), Forge Books.

Standalones 
Trust Me (2018), Forge Books. 
The Murder List (2019), Forge Books. 
The First to Lie (2020), Forge Books. 
Her Perfect Life (2021), Forge Books. 
The House Guest (2023), Forge Books. ISBN 978-1-2508-4956-4

References

External links

 

Year of birth missing (living people)
Living people
Miami University alumni
Agatha Award winners
American mystery writers
21st-century American novelists
American women novelists
American television reporters and correspondents
Writers from Indianapolis
Writers from Boston
Western College for Women alumni
Anthony Award winners
Women mystery writers
21st-century American women writers
American women television journalists
Novelists from Indiana
Novelists from Massachusetts
21st-century American non-fiction writers